Steven Elliot Tisch (born February 14, 1949) is an American film producer and businessman. He is the chairman, co-owner and executive vice president of the New York Giants, the NFL team co-owned by his family, as well as a film and television producer. He is the son of former Giants co-owner Bob Tisch.

Early life
Tisch was born in Lakewood Township, New Jersey, the son of Joan (née Hyman) and Preston Robert Tisch, a film and television executive who also served as the United States Postmaster General. He has two siblings, Jonathan Tisch and Laurie Tisch. His family is Jewish. He attended Tufts University, during which he began his filmmaking career.

Career

1970s–2000
During his youth, Tisch created a number of small films with backing by Columbia Pictures. In 1976, he left Columbia and created his first feature film, Outlaw Blues. He followed this up in 1983 with Risky Business, which gave Tom Cruise his first lead role.

In 1984, Tisch produced a made-for-TV movie entitled The Burning Bed, which caused controversy but also received eleven Emmy nominations for Farrah Fawcett's depiction of a battered wife. Tisch launched his own production company in 1986, called the Steve Tisch Company, which has since specialized in small screen films. The company originally had a two-picture agreement with New World Pictures, with Soul Man being the first film of a proposed two-picture deal. In 1987, the company set up multiple projects at Warner Bros., which included the feature rights to the Mr. Magoo character (the project was eventually made by Disney in 1997 as a live-action film), as well as three original projects that the company, by way of Steve Tisch Productions had a contract at the studio. However, he also produced several critically acclaimed films including Forrest Gump, American History X, and Snatch. Tisch received a Best Motion Picture Academy Award and a Golden Globe for Forrest Gump, which was nominated for 13 Academy Awards and won six, and remains one of the highest domestic box office grossing films in history. He is also the only person ever with a Golden Globe, an Academy Award, a Primetime Emmy Award nomination, and a Super Bowl Ring.

2001–present
He is currently a partner in Escape Artists, an independently financed film production company based at Sony Pictures Entertainment that is the result of a merger between his Steve Tisch Company and fellow partners Todd Black and Jason Blumenthal's production company, Black & Blu. Escape Artists released The Weather Man, starring Nicolas Cage, in the fall of 2005, and The Pursuit of Happyness, starring Will Smith, was released by Columbia Pictures in December 2006. Other projects include Seven Pounds starring Will Smith, Knowing, starring Nicolas Cage and The Taking of Pelham 123 starring Denzel Washington and John Travolta. The company's TV projects include Perpetual Grace, LTD. for Epix and Servant starring Nell Tiger Free for Apple TV+.

In 2007, Tisch received the P.T. Barnum Award from Tufts University for his exceptional work in the field of media and entertainment.

Tisch was named chairman and Executive Vice President of the New York Giants American football team in 2005. Tisch accepted the Vince Lombardi Trophy twice, when the Giants won Super Bowl XLII and again when they won Super Bowl XLVI. On April 30, 2008, Tisch along with the rest of the Giants team and administration were invited by President Bush to the White House to honor the Giants Super Bowl victory.

Tisch also made an appearance on the reality show Shark Tank in season 5.

Following the 2021 season, when the Giants finished 4-13, Tisch "pushed" John Mara to fire head coach Joe Judge, after John Mara was reportedly willing to give Judge a third year.

Personal life
Tisch has been married twice. He had two children with his first wife, Patsy A. Tisch; the marriage ended in divorce. In 1996, Tisch married Jamie Leigh Anne Alexander. They had three children, Elizabeth, Holden and Zachary, before divorcing.

On August 10, 2020, he announced that his daughter, Hilary, died by suicide following a history of depression. She was 36.

His brother Jonathan serves as the Giants' treasurer.

Filmography
He was a producer in all films unless otherwise noted.

Film

As an actor

Miscellaneous crew

Thanks

Television

As an actor

As director

References

External links
New York Giants bio

 

1949 births
Living people
American film producers
Businesspeople from New Jersey
Jewish American sportspeople
New York Giants executives
New York Giants owners
Sportspeople from Lakewood Township, New Jersey
Producers who won the Best Picture Academy Award
Steve Tisch
The Frederick Gunn School alumni
Tufts University alumni
Golden Globe Award-winning producers
American independent film production company founders